Marek Plašil (born 19 December 1985) is a professional Czech football player.

References

Guardian Football

Czech footballers
1985 births
Living people
Sportspeople from Hradec Králové
Czech First League players
FC Hradec Králové players
FK Hvězda Cheb players
1. FK Příbram players
Association football defenders